Brie is a variety of soft cheese.

Brie may also refer to:

People
 Brie (name)

Places
 Brie (region), the region from which brie cheese originated
 Brie, Aisne, a commune in the Aisne département
 Brie, Ariège, a commune in the Ariège département
 Brie, Charente, a commune in the Charente département
 Brie, Deux-Sèvres, a commune in the Deux-Sèvres département
 Brie, Ille-et-Vilaine, a commune in the Ille-et-Vilaine département
 Brie, Somme, a commune in the Somme département

See also
 Bree (disambiguation)
 Bries (disambiguation)
 Armentières-en-Brie, in the Seine-et-Marne département
 Augers-en-Brie, in the Seine-et-Marne département
 Baulne-en-Brie, in the Aisne département
 Brie-Comte-Robert, in the Seine-et-Marne département
 Brie-sous-Archiac, in the Charente-Maritime département
 Brie-sous-Barbezieux, in the Charente département
 Brie-sous-Chalais, in the Charente département
 Brie-sous-Matha, in the Charente-Maritime département
 Brie-sous-Mortagne, in the Charente-Maritime département
 Chailly-en-Brie, in the Seine-et-Marne département
 Chanteloup-en-Brie, in the Seine-et-Marne département
 Chaumes-en-Brie, in the Seine-et-Marne département
 Choisy-en-Brie, in the Seine-et-Marne département
 Condé-en-Brie, in the Aisne département
 Crèvecœur-en-Brie, in the Seine-et-Marne département
 Ferrières-en-Brie, in the Seine-et-Marne département
 Fontenelle-en-Brie, in the Aisne département
 La Croix-en-Brie, in the Seine-et-Marne département
 La Houssaye-en-Brie, in the Seine-et-Marne département
 La Queue-en-Brie, in the Val-de-Marne département
 Laval-en-Brie, in the Seine-et-Marne département
 Le Châtelet-en-Brie, in the Seine-et-Marne département
 Leudon-en-Brie, in the Seine-et-Marne département
 Liverdy-en-Brie, in the Seine-et-Marne département
 Loisy-en-Brie, in the Marne département
 Maisoncelles-en-Brie, in the Seine-et-Marne département
 Marchais-en-Brie, in the Aisne département
 Mareuil-en-Brie, in the Marne département
 Marles-en-Brie, in the Seine-et-Marne département
 Marolles-en-Brie, Seine-et-Marne, in the Seine-et-Marne département
 Marolles-en-Brie, Val-de-Marne, in the Val-de-Marne département
 Neufmoutiers-en-Brie, in the Seine-et-Marne département
 Presles-en-Brie, in the Seine-et-Marne département
 Reuil-en-Brie, in the Seine-et-Marne département
 Roissy-en-Brie, in the Seine-et-Marne département
 Rozay-en-Brie, in the Seine-et-Marne département
 Saint-Just-en-Brie, in the Seine-et-Marne département
 Saint-Ouen-en-Brie, in the Seine-et-Marne département
 Soignolles-en-Brie, in the Seine-et-Marne département
 Sucy-en-Brie, in the Val-de-Marne département
 Tournan-en-Brie, in the Seine-et-Marne département
 Valence-en-Brie, in the Seine-et-Marne département
 Vaudoy-en-Brie, in the Seine-et-Marne département